Terry L. McMillan is a former American football player and coach. He served as the head football coach at Mississippi College from 1991 to 1999, compiling a record of 45–42–5. McMillan played college football at the University of Southern Mississippi, where he lettered four times as a quarterback.

Head coaching record

College

References

Year of birth missing (living people)
Living people
American football quarterbacks
Mississippi College Choctaws football coaches
Southern Miss Golden Eagles football players
High school football coaches in Mississippi